Bioko Sur ( Spanish for "South Bioko") is a province of Equatorial Guinea. Its capital is Luba.  It occupies the southern part of the island of Bioko, the remainder of which is part of Bioko Norte.

Part of the Parque Nacional del Pico Basilé, created in 2000, is in Bioko Sur.

References

 
Provinces of Equatorial Guinea
Bioko